Seen is a district in the Swiss city of Winterthur. It is district number 3.

The district comprises the quarters Waser, Büelwiesen, Waldegg, Ganzenbühl, Sonnenberg, Ricketwil, Oberseen, Gotzenwil, Eidberg, Iberg and Sennhof.

Seen was formerly a municipality of its own, but was incorporated into Winterthur in 1922.

Transport 
Winterthur-Seen railway station is a stop of the S-Bahn Zürich on the line S11 and S26.

The station is also a terminus of line 2 of the Winterthur trolleybus system.

References

Winterthur
Former municipalities of the canton of Zürich